Godyris crinippa is a species of butterfly of the family Nymphalidae. It is found in Bolivia and Peru.

Subspecies
Godyris crinippa crinippa (Bolivia)
Godyris crinippa new subspecies (Peru)

References

Butterflies described in 1874
Ithomiini
Nymphalidae of South America
Taxa named by William Chapman Hewitson